The Greyfriars' Chronicle was a chronicle during the Tudor period. It was published in 1852 and was edited by J.G. Nichols. It documents political and religious events in and around London, England from the reign of Richard I to the reign of Mary I. Most of its content is sixteenth century.

References

External links
 Chronicle of the Grey Friars of London on archive.org

Tudor England
English chronicles